Larissa is the capital and largest city of the Thessaly region in Greece. It is the fourth-most populous city in Greece with a population of 144,651 in the city proper, according to the 2011 census. It is also capital of the Larissa regional unit. It is a principal agricultural centre and a national transport hub, linked by road and rail with the port of Volos, the cities of Thessaloniki and Athens. The municipality of Larissa has 162,591 inhabitants, while the regional unit of Larissa reached a population of 284,325.

Legend has it that Achilles was born here. Hippocrates, the "Father of Medicine", died here. Today, Larissa is an important commercial, transportation, educational, agricultural and industrial centre of Greece. The city straddles the Pineios river and N.-NE. of the city are the Mount Olympus and Mount Kissavos.

Geography

There are a number of highways including E75 and the main railway from Athens to Thessaloniki (Salonika) crossing through Thessaly. The region is directly linked to the rest of Europe through the International Airport of Central Greece located in Nea Anchialos a short distance from Larissa (about ). Larissa lies on the river Pineios.

The Larissa Chasma, a deep gash in the surface of Dione, a natural satellite of Saturn, was named after Larissa.

Mythology

According to Greek mythology it is said that the city was founded by Acrisius, who was killed accidentally by his grandson, Perseus. There lived Peleus, the hero beloved by the gods, and his son Achilles.

In mythology, the nymph Larissa was a daughter of the primordial man Pelasgus.

The city of Larissa is mentioned in Book II of Iliad by Homer: "Hippothous led the tribes of Pelasgian spearsmen, who dwelt in fertile Larissa- Hippothous, and Pylaeus of the race of Mars, two sons of the Pelasgian Lethus, son of Teutamus." The Internet Classics Archive | The Iliad by Homer In this paragraph, Homer shows that the Pelasgians, Trojan allies, used to live in the city of Larissa. It is likely that this city of Larissa was different to the city that was the birthplace of Achilles.  The Larissa that features as a Trojan ally in the Iliad was likely to be located in the Troad, on the other side of the Aegean Sea.

History

Antiquity

Pre-history
Traces of Paleolithic human settlement have been recovered from the area, but it was peripheral to areas of advanced culture. The area around Larissa was extremely fruitful; it was agriculturally important and in antiquity was known for its horses.

Archaic Era

The name Larissa (Λάρισα Lárīsa) is in origin a Pelasgian word for "fortress". There were many ancient Greek cities with this name.
The name of Thessalian Larissa is first recorded in connection with the aristocratic Aleuadai family.<ref>"The city and the plain around it were settled in prehistoric times, and its name must be early, but it is first mentioned in connection with the(Richard Stillwell, William L. MacDonald, Marian Holland McAllister, eds., The Princeton Encyclopedia of Classical Sites (Princeton University Press) 1976, 's.v. "Larissa, or Larisa, or Pelasgis, Thessaly").</ref> It was also a polis (city-state).

Classical Era
Larissa was a polis (city-state) during the Classical Era. Larissa is thought to be where the famous Greek physician Hippocrates and the famous philosopher Gorgias of Leontini died.

When Larissa ceased minting the federal coins it shared with other Thessalian towns and adopted its own coinage in the late fifth century BC, it chose local types for its coins. The obverse depicted the nymph of the local spring,  Larissa, for whom the town was named; probably the choice was inspired by the famous coins of Kimon depicting the Syracusan nymph Arethusa. The reverse depicted a horse in various poses. The horse was an appropriate symbol of Thessaly, a land of plains, which was well known for its horses. Usually there is a male figure; he should perhaps be seen as the eponymous hero of the Thessalians, Thessalos, who is probably also to be identified on many of the earlier, federal coins of Thessaly.

Larissa, sometimes written Larisa on ancient coins and inscriptions, is near the site of the Homeric Argissa. It appears in early times, when Thessaly was mainly governed by a few aristocratic families, as an important city under the rule of the Aleuadae, whose authority extended over the whole district of Pelasgiotis. This powerful family possessed for many generations before 369 BC the privilege of furnishing the tagus, the local term for the strategos of the combined Thessalian forces. The principal rivals of the Aleuadae were the Scopadae of Crannon, the remains of which are about 14 miles south west.

Larissa was the birthplace of Meno, who thus became, along with Xenophon and a few others, one of the generals leading several thousands Greeks from various places, in the ill-fated expedition of 401 (retold in Xenophon's Anabasis) meant to help Cyrus the Younger, son of Darius II, king of Persia, overthrow his elder brother Artaxerxes II and take over the throne of Persia (Meno is featured in Plato's dialogue bearing his name, in which Socrates uses the example of "the way to Larissa" to help explain Meno the difference between true opinion and science (Meno, 97a–c); this "way to Larissa" might well be on the part of Socrates an attempt to call to Meno's mind a "way home", understood as the way toward one's true and "eternal" home reached only at death, that each man is supposed to seek in his life).

The constitution of the town was democratic, which explains why it sided with Athens in the Peloponnesian War. In the neighbourhood of Larissa was celebrated a festival which recalled the Roman Saturnalia, and at which the slaves were waited on by their masters. As the chief city of ancient Thessaly, Larissa was taken by the Thebans and later directly annexed by Philip II of Macedon in 344. It remained under Macedonian control afterwards, except for a brief period when Demetrius Poliorcetes captured it in 302 BC.

Hellenistic Era

Roman Era
It was in Larissa that Philip V of Macedon signed in 197 BC a treaty with the Romans after his defeat at the Battle of Cynoscephalae, and it was there also that Antiochus III the Great, won a great victory in 192 BC. In 196 BC Larissa became an ally of Rome and was the headquarters of the Thessalian League.

Larissa is frequently mentioned in connection with the Roman civil wars which preceded the establishment of the Roman Empire and Pompey sought refuge there after the defeat of Pharsalus.

Middle Ages

Larissa was sacked by the Ostrogoths in the late 5th century, and rebuilt under the Byzantine emperor Justinian I.

In the eighth century, the city became the metropolis of the theme of Hellas. The city was captured in 986 by Tsar Samuel of Bulgaria, who carried off the relics of its patron saint, Saint Achilleios, to Prespa. It was again unsuccessfully besieged by the Italo-Normans under Bohemond I in 1082/3.

After the Fourth Crusade, the King of Thessalonica, Boniface of Montferrat, gave the city to Lombard barons, but they launched a rebellion in 1209 that had to be subdued by the Latin Emperor Henry of Flanders himself. The city was recovered by Epirus soon after.

 Ottoman period 
Larissa was conquered by the Ottoman Empire in 1386/87 and again in the 1390s, but only came under permanent Ottoman control in 1423, by Turahan Bey. Under Ottoman rule, the city was known as Yeni-şehir i-Fenari, "new citadel". As the chief town and military base of Ottoman Thessaly, Larissa was a predominantly Muslim city.In 1520s the town had with 90.2% Muslim majority with 693 households whereas Christians were only 9.8% with 75 households. At that time there were no Jewish or Armenian households in the town. During Ottoman rule the administration of the Metropolis of Larissa was transferred to nearby Trikala where it remained until 1734, when Metropolitan Iakovos II returned the see from Trikala to Larissa and established the present-day metropolis of Larissa and Tyrnavos.

The town was noted for its trade fair in the 17th and 18th centuries, while the seat of the pasha of Thessaly was also transferred there in 1770. Larissa was the headquarters of Hursid Pasha during the Greek War of Independence. It was also renowned for its mosques (four of which were still in use in the late 19th century) and its muslim cemeteries.

The city remained a part of the Ottoman Empire until Thessaly became part of the independent Kingdom of Greece in 1881, except for a period where Ottoman forces re-occupied it during the Greco-Turkish War of 1897. In the late 19th century, there was still a small village in the outskirts of the town inhabited by Africans from Sudan, a curious remnant of the forces collected by Ali Pasha.

In the 19th century, the town produced leather, cotton, silk and tobacco. Fevers and agues were prevalent owing to bad drainage and the overflowing of the river; and the death rate was higher than the birth rate.

Modern Greek era

In 1881, the city, along with the rest of Thessaly, was incorporated into the Kingdom of Greece during the prime ministry of Alexandros Koumoundouros. On 31 August 1881 a unit of the Greek Army headed by General Skarlatos Soutsos entered the city. A considerable portion of the Turkish population emigrated into the Ottoman Empire at that point. In this new era the city starts gradually to expand and to be rebuilt by the Greek authorities.

During the Greco-Turkish War of 1897, the city was the headquarters of Greek Crown Prince Constantine. The flight of the Greek army from here to Farsala took place on April 23, 1897. Turkish troops entered the city two days later. After a treaty for peace was signed, they withdrew and Larissa remained permanently in Greece. This was followed by a further exodus of Turks in 1898. The Hassan Bey mosque (which was built in the early 16th century) was demolished in 1908.

During the Axis Occupation of the country, the Jewish community of the city (dated back to second BC, see Romaniotes) suffered heavy losses. Today in the city there is a Holocaust memorial and a synagogue.

 After WWII 

After WWII the city was expanded rapidly. Today Larissa is the fourth largest Greek city with many squares, taverns and cafes. It has three public hospitals with one being a military hospital. It hosts the Hellenic Air Force Headquarters and NATO Headquarters in Greece. It has a School of Medicine and a School of Biochemistry – Biotechnology and the third largest in the country Institute of Technology. It occupies the first place among Greek cities into green coverage rate per square-metre urban space and the first place with the highest percentance of bars-taverns-restaurants per capita in Greece. It also has two public libraries and five museums.

Ecclesiastical history

Christianity penetrated early to Larissa, though its first bishop is recorded only in 325 at the Council of Nicaea. St. Achillius of the fourth century, is celebrated for his miracles. Le Quien cites twenty-nine bishops from the fourth to the 18th centuries; the most famous is Jeremias II, who occupied the see until 733, when the Emperor Leo III the Isaurian transferred it from the jurisdiction of the Pope of Rome to the Patriarchate of Constantinople. In the first years of the tenth century it had ten suffragan sees; subsequently the number increased and about the year 1175 under the Emperor Manuel I Comnenus, it reached twenty-eight. At the close of the 15th century, under the Ottoman domination, there were only ten suffragan sees, which gradually grew less and finally disappeared.

Larissa is an Orthodox Metropolis of the Church of Greece.

It was also briefly a Latin archbishopric in the early 13th century, and remains a Latin Metropolitan (top-ranking) titular see of the Roman Catholic Church, which must not be confused with the Latin episcopal (low-ranking) titular see Larissa in Syria. Today there is a Catholic church in the city (Sacred Heart of Jesus).

Sights

In the area from the Frourio hill to the Central square is located the old part of the city where some of its main landmarks are. Sights of the city are:

 The Frourio Hill and the adjacent First Ancient Greek Theatre area.
 The Pineios river that crosses the city center near the St. Achillios church and the Alkazar Park next to the lush river banks of Pineios river.
 The First Ancient Greek Theatre of Larissa, built in the 3rd c. BC.
 The Second Ancient Theatre, built in the 1st c. BC.
 The Basilica of St. Achillios. Early Byzantine basilica ruins dedicated to the city's patron saint, St. Achillios. 
 The church of St. Achillios Cathedral.
 The Bezesten of Larissa. Built in the 15th c. was an ottoman enclosed market and also used in the 19th c. as a gunpowder magazine and fort. 
 The Yeni Mosque, a rare example of 19th c. mosque built in neoclassical style, now used as a museum.
 The Ottoman Baths probably built in the 15th c.
 The Cenotaph monument of Hippocrates, the 4th c. B.C. votive stele dedicated to Poseidon and many other ancient ruins and monuments.
 The Diachronic Museum of Larissa with finds that cover all history of Larissa since antiquity.
 Historical buildings that have been listed as architecturally preserved, such as the Mill of Pappas, the Cine Palace (architect Colonello), the Charokopos Tower (arch. Anastasios Metaxas, buit in 1902, endangered to collapse as of 2022) and the neoclassical complex of the Averofeios Agricultural School (built in 1908).

Administration
The municipality Larissa was formed at the 2011 local government reform by the merger of the following 3 former municipalities, that became municipal units:
Giannouli
Koilada
Larissa

 Climate 
The climate of Larissa is cool semi-arid (Köppen: BSk) but it is close to a hot summer Mediterranean climate (Csa). The winter is fairly mild, and some snowstorms may occur. The summer is particularly hot, and temperatures of  may occur. Thunderstorms or heavy rain may cause agricultural damage. Larissa receives  of rain per year.

 Districts 
The municipal unit of Larissa is divided into four city-districts or municipal communities (29 city areas) plus 2 suburban communities (Amphithea and Koulourion). The municipality includes also the Community of Terpsithèa (with the suburban community of Argyssa).

1st Municipal District
(pop. 26,035)
 Papastàvrou
 Saint Athanàsios
 Alkazàr
 Hippocrates-Pèra
 Potamòpolis
 Philippòpolis
 Livadàki
 Saint Thomas
 Saint Paraskevi-Mezourlo
 Neàpolis

2nd Municipal District
(pop. 41,816)
 Saint Achellios
 Saint Nikòlaos
 Ambelòkipoi
 Saints Sarànta
 Saint Konstantinos
 Stathmòs

3rd Municipal District
(pop. 30,121)
 Lachanòkipoi
 Nèa Smyrne-Kamynia
 Kalyvia-Saint Marina
 Saint Geòrgios
 Anatoli
 Koulouri
 Amphithèa

4th Municipal District
(pop. 26,814)
 Charavgi-Toumba-OKE
 Pyrovolikà-Pharos
 Avèrof-Sèkfo
 Nèa Politia
 Epiròtika
 Anthoupolis
 Neràida
 Kàmpos

Community of Terpsithèa
(pop. 1,290)
 Terpsithèa
 Argyssa

From 1 January 2011, in accordance with the Kallikratis Plan (new administrative division of Greece), the new municipality of Larissa includes also the former municipalities of Giannouli and Koilada.

Province
The province of Larissa was one of the provinces of the Larissa Prefecture. Its territory corresponded with that of the current municipalities Larissa (except the municipal unit Giannouli) and Tempi (except the municipal units Gonnoi and Kato Olympos). It was abolished in 2006.

 Main streets 

 Anthimou Gazi Street
 Kouma Street
 Roosevelt Street
 31 August Street
 Karamanli Avenue
 Koumoundourou
 Mandilara
 Rizopoulou
 Papanastasiou
 Venizelou (former Makedonias)
 Kyprou (Alexandras)
 Polykarpou

 Asclepiou Street
 Iroon Polytechniou Avenue
 Lambraki Street
 Thetidos Street
 Korai
 Ipsilanti
 Tsimiski
 Sklirou
 Panagouli
 Ioanninon
 Kolokotroni
 Manolaki
 Nikitara

Economy
Larissa is a major agricultural center of Greece, due to the plain of Thessaly.

In manufacturing sector, Larissa is among others home to Biokarpet carpet company (whose owners were also major shareholders of AEL FC in the past) and Orient Bikes.

It comes also in first place with the highest percentage of bars-taverns-restaurants per capita in Greece. Mikel Coffee Company and Bruno Coffee Stores chains started and have also their base in the city.

Culture

Theatres and Odeons
Municipal Conservatory of Larissa
Pappas's Mile Theatre
Municipal Theatre OUHL of Larissa (Thessalian Theatre)
Hatzigianeio Cultural Centre
Tiritomba Shadows Theatre

Cuisine

Local specialities:Batzina (Μπατζίνα) pie baked in the ovenKelaidi (Κελαηδί)Pita (Πίτα, traditional pies with pasta phyllo, baked in the oven) like Kreatopita, Loukanikopita, Melintzanopita, Tyropita, SpanakopitaPlastós (Πλαστός) pieLahanópsomo (Λαχανόψωμο) cabbage breadHalvas (Χαλβάς) sweet

Museums
Diachronic Museum of Larissa / Archaeological and Byzantine Myseum of Larissa
Municipal Gallery of Larissa – G.I. Katsigras Museum
Folklore and Historical Museum of Larissa
Military Veterinary Museum of Larissa
Museum of the Folklore Society of Larissa
Museum of Grain and Flours

Media
TV: Thessalian Radio Television (TRT), Astra TV, ForMedia TV
Press: Eleftheria, Politia Larisseon (newspaper)Festivals
Among the notable festivals that the city hosts, is the "Pineiou Festival" (mainly music), "Mill of Performing Arts" and "AgroThessaly", a major agricultural fair.

Organizations
Panhellenic Federation of Cultural Associations of Vlachs

In popular culture
A notable film of the Greek cinema partially shot in the area of Larissa and referred to the history of the region is Blood on the Land (1966) by Vasilis Georgiadis.

Transport

Larissa sits in the middle of the plain of Thessaly, with connections to Motorway A1 and national roads EO3 and EO6.
Larissa's Urban Bus System
Larissa's Interurban System (Ktel Larissas)
Larissa Central Railway Station Station at 
Mezourlo Freight Railway station at 
Larissa National Airport (military)

 Close destinations 
The city is in close proximity of many interesting destinations in the region (Mount Olympus, Mount Kissavos, Meteora, Lake Plastira, Pilio, etc.) suitable for daily trips.

Sports

The local football club AEL FC currently participates in Superleague Greece. The team won the Greek Championship, in 1988, and won the Greek Cup in 1985 and 2007. These titles place AEL among the five most important football clubs in Greece. 

Two other professional football clubs with long histories also represent the city: Apollon and Iraklis.

AEL has hosted its home games at the AEL FC Arena, a UEFA 3-star-rated football ground, since November 2010. Other important sport venues are the National Sport Center of Larissa'' (EAK Larissas), which includes the Alcazar Stadium and the Neapoli Indoor Hall.

The National Sports Center of Larissa can accommodate a number of sports and events (football, basketball, wrestling, swimming, boxing, martial arts, handball, water polo, etc.), while the Sports Hall has hosted important athletic events (the 1995 FIBA Under-19 World Cup, the 1997 Women's EuroLeague Final Four, the 2003 Greek Basketball Cup Final Four, martial arts events, etc.), and it is also used for cultural events, such as dance festivals.

Historical population

Notable people

Ancient
Campaspe, mistress of Alexander the Great
Achilles (mythology)
Gorgias of Leontinoi (483 BC–375 BC), sophist. He worked and died in Larissa.
Hippocrates of Kos (460 BC–370 BC), physician. He worked and died in Larissa.
Medius (4th century BC), officer of Alexander the Great
Philinna (4th century BC), dancer, mother of Philip III Arrhidaeus
Philo (1st century BC), philosopher
Heliodorus of Larissa, mathematician
Achillius of Larissa (270–330), first bishop and patron saint of the city

Medieval
Irene of Larissa, empress consort of Bulgaria
Agatha, wife of Samuel of Bulgaria
Nikoulitzas Delphinas, Byzantine lord of Larissa

Modern
Alexander Helladius, scholar
Giorgakis Olympios (1772–1821), commander of the Greek War of Independence
Theoklitos Farmakidis (1784–1860), scholar, figure of the Modern Greek Enlightenment
Moshe Pesach (1869–1955), rabbi
Michail Sapkas, mayor of Larissa and MP
Achilleas Protosyngelos, Army officer
M. Karagatsis (1908–1960), novelist and journalist
Sofia Vembo (1910–1978), singer and actress
Eleni Zafeiriou (1916–2004), actress
Antonis Vratsanos (1919–2008), resistance figure during WWII
Kostas Gousgounis (1931–2022), pornographic actor
Athena Tacha (1936–), artist
Efthymios Christodoulou (1932–), economist
Georgios Souflias (1941–), politician
Angela Kokkola, politician
Petros Efthimiou (1950–), politician
Lakis Lazopoulos (1956–), actor, comedian, script author and director
Thanasis Papakonstantinou (1959–), poet, songwriter, singer and musician
Georgios Mitsibonas (1962–1997), footballer
Maria Papayanni (1964–), writer
Vassilis Karapialis (1965–), footballer
Christos Papoutsis, politician
Maria Spyraki, politician
Ekaterini Voggoli (1970–), discus thrower
Alexis Georgoulis (1974–), actor
Kostas Chalkias (1974–), footballer
Yannis Goumas (1975–), footballer
Dimosthenis Dikoudis (1977–), basketball player
Nestoras Kommatos (1977–), basketball player
Fani Halkia (1979–), hurdler
Dimitris Spanoulis (1979–), basketball player
Theofanis Gekas (1980–), footballer
Vangelis Moras (1981–), footballer
Vassilis Spanoulis (1982–), basketball player
Giorgos Tsiaras (1982–), basketball player
Vasilios Koutsianikoulis (1988–), footballer
Haido Alexouli (1991–), long jumper
Chrysoula Anagnostopoulou (1991–), discus thrower
Vasileia Zachou (1994–), gymnast

Mayor history 

 Hasan Etem Aga (1881–1882)
 Argyrios Didikas
 Christos Georgiadis
 Dionysios Galatis
 Achilleas Asteriadis
 Achilleas Logiotatou
 Konstantinos Anastasiadis
 Konstantinos Markidis
 Vasileios Sylivridis
 Anastasios Zarmanis
 Michail Sapkas (1914–1917, 1925–1934)
 Konstantinos Vlachos
 Christos Koutsoubas
 Dimitris Papageorgiou

 Vasileios Arsenidis
 Stylianos Asteriadis
 Nikolaos Tzavellas
 Dimitrios Karathanos
 Sotirios Zazias
 Dimitrios Hatzigiannis
 Athanasios Messinis
 Stylianos Zografidis
 Agamemnon Blanas (1975–1978)
 Alexandros Chondronasios (1978–1980)
 Aristeides Labroulis (1980–1994)
 Christodoulos Kafes (1994–1998)
 Konstantinos Tzanakoulis (1998–2014)
 Apostolos Kalogiannis (2014–)

Twin towns – sister cities

Larissa is twinned with:

 Anapa, Russia (2016)
 Bălți, Moldova (1986)
 Banská Bystrica, Slovakia (1985)

 Foča, Bosnia and Herzegovina (1994)
 Knoxville, United States (1996)
 Kos, Greece (1978)
 Larnaca, Cyprus (1990)
 Rybnik, Poland (2003)
 Stara Zagora, Bulgaria (1985)

Gallery

See also
Ampelakia, Larissa
Vale of Tempe
University of Thessaly
CERETETH, Center of Technology Thessaly

References

External links

Source
Official Website
Region of Thessaly Official Website
International airport of Central Greece
Larissa on Web
Larissa The Official website of the Greek National Tourism Organisation
Larissa Photos 

 
Municipalities of Thessaly
Greek regional capitals
Provinces of Greece
Pelasgian words
Pelasgiotis
Populated places in ancient Thessaly
Cities in ancient Greece
Thessalian city-states
Populated places in Larissa (regional unit)